"Running Free" is a song by Iron Maiden.

Running Free may also refer to:

 Running Free (album), an album by Dragon
 Running Free (Stillwater album), an album by Stillwater
 Running Free (film), a 2000 film about a horse during the Great War